Tennis Master is a tennis video game released in 2007 by System 3 for use on various systems, including the Wii. It has been released in Europe and North America.

References

Tennis video games
Video games developed in the United Kingdom
Wii games